KMZR is a Regional Mexican formatted broadcast radio station licensed to Atwater, California, serving Merced, California. KMZR is owned and operated by Alfredo Plascencia's Radio Lazer, through licensee Lazer Licenses, LLC.

History
The station was assigned the call letters KVRQ on April 15, 1991. On July 16, 1991, the station changed its call sign to KVRK, on July 18, 1991, to KVRQ, on April 30, 1999, to KJMQ, on February 2, 2012, to KBRE, and on May 4, 2016, to the current KMZR.

On May 4, 2016, Radio Lazer changed call letters to KMZR and flipped its format to Regional Mexican; the previous active rock format was moved with the KBRE call letters to 1660 AM and 105.7 FM.

Previous logo

References

External links
 

MZR
Active rock radio stations in the United States
Mass media in Merced County, California
Radio stations established in 1997
1997 establishments in California